Rosalind Epstein Krauss (born November 30, 1941) is an American art critic, art theorist and a professor at Columbia University in New York City. Krauss is known for her scholarship in 20th-century painting, sculpture and photography. As a critic and theorist she has published steadily since 1965 in Artforum, Art International and Art in America. She was associate editor of Artforum from 1971 to 1974 and has been editor of October, a journal of contemporary arts criticism and theory that she co-founded in 1976.

Early life
Krauss was born to Matthew M. Epstein and Bertha Luber  in Washington D.C. and grew up in the area, visiting art museums with her father. After graduating from Wellesley in 1962, she attended Harvard, whose Department of Fine Arts (now Department of History of Art and Architecture) had a strong tradition of the intensive analysis of actual art objects under the aegis of the Fogg Museum.

Krauss wrote her dissertation on the work of David Smith. Krauss received her Ph.D. in 1969. The dissertation was published as Terminal Iron Works in 1971.

In the late-1960s and early-1970s Krauss began to contribute articles to art journals such as Art International and Artforum — which, under the editorship of Philip Leider, was relocated from California to New York. She began by writing the "Boston Letter" for Art International, but soon published well-received articles on Jasper Johns (Lugano Review, 1965) and Donald Judd (Allusion and Illusion in Donald Judd, Artforum, May 1966). Her commitment to the emerging minimal art in particular set her apart from Michael Fried, who was oriented toward the continuation of modernist abstraction in Jules Olitski, Kenneth Noland and Anthony Caro. Krauss's article A View of Modernism (Artforum, September 1972), was one signal of this break.

Career

Founding October
Krauss became dissatisfied with Artforum when in its November 1974 issue it published a full-page advertisement by featuring the artist Lynda Benglis aggressively posed with a large latex dildo and wearing only a pair of sunglasses promoting an upcoming exhibition of hers at the Paula Cooper Gallery. Although Benglis' image is now popularly cited as an important example of gender performativity in contemporary art, it provoked mixed responses when it first appeared. Krauss and other Artforum personnel attacked Benglis' work in the following month's issue of Artforum, describing the advertisement as exploitative and brutalizing, and soon left the magazine to co-found October in 1976.

October was formed as a politically-charged journal that introduced American readers to the ideas of French post-structuralism, made popular by Michel Foucault and Roland Barthes. Krauss used October as a way of publishing essays on post-structuralist art theory, Deconstructionist theory, psychoanalysis, postmodernism and feminism.

The founders included Krauss, Annette Michelson and the artist Jeremy Gilbert-Rolfe. Krauss was appointed as its founding editor. Jeremy Gilbert-Rolfe withdrew after only a few issues, and by the spring of 1977, Douglas Crimp joined the editorial team. In 1990, after Crimp left the journal, Krauss and Michelson were joined by Yve-Alain Bois, Hal Foster, Benjamin H. D. Buchloh, Denis Hollier, and John Rajchman.

Academic

Hunter College
Krauss taught at Wellesley, MIT and Princeton before joining the faculty at Hunter College in 1974. She was promoted to professor in 1977 at Hunter and was also appointed professor at the Graduate Center of CUNY. She held the title of Distinguished Professor at Hunter until she left to join the Columbia University faculty in 1992. In 1985, a monograph of essays by Krauss, titled The Originality of the Avant-Garde and Other Modernist Myths was published by The MIT Press.

Columbia University
Previously Meyer Schapiro Professor of Modern Art and Theory at Columbia, in 2005 Rosalind Krauss was promoted to the highest faculty rank of University Professor. She has received fellowships from the John Simon Guggenheim Memorial Foundation and the National Endowment for the Arts and has been a fellow of the Center for Advanced Study in the Visual Arts and of the Institute for Advanced Study. She received the Frank Jewett Mather Award for criticism from the College Art Association in 1973. She has been a fellow of the New York Institute for the Humanities since 1992, was elected a member of the American Academy of Arts and Sciences in 1994, and became a member of the American Philosophical Society in 2012. She recently received an honorary doctorate from the University of London.

Curator
Krauss has been curator of many art exhibitions at leading museums, among them exhibitions on Joan Miró at the Solomon R. Guggenheim Museum (1970–73), on surrealism and photography at the Corcoran Museum of Art (1982–85), on Richard Serra at the Museum of Modern Art (1985–86), and on Robert Morris at the Guggenheim (1992–94). She prepared an exhibition for the Centre Georges Pompidou in Paris called "Formlessness: Modernism Against the Grain" in 1996.

Critical approach

Greenbergian tradition
Krauss's attempts to understand the phenomenon of modernist art, in its historical, theoretical, and formal dimensions, have led her in various directions. She has, for example, been interested in the development of photography, whose history – running parallel to that of modernist painting and sculpture – makes visible certain previously overlooked phenomena in the "high arts", such as the role of the indexical mark, or the function of the archive. She has also investigated certain concepts, such as "formlessness", "the optical unconscious", or "pastiche", which organize modernist practice in relation to different explanatory grids from those of progressive modernism, or the avant-garde.

Like many, Krauss had been drawn to the criticism of Clement Greenberg, as a counterweight to the highly subjective, poetic approach of Harold Rosenberg. The poet-critic model proved long-lasting in the New York scene, with products from Frank O'Hara to Kynaston McShine to Peter Schjeldahl, but for Krauss and others, its basis in subjective expression was fatally unable to account for how a particular artwork's objective structure gives rise to its associated subjective effects.

Greenberg's way of assessing how an art object works, or how it is put together, became for Krauss a fruitful resource; even if she and fellow "Greenberger", Michael Fried, would break first with the older critic, and then with each other, at particular moments of judgment, the commitment to formal analysis as the necessary if not sufficient ground of serious criticism would still remain for both of them. Decades after her first engagement with Greenberg, Krauss still used his ideas about an artwork's 'medium' as a jumping-off point for her strongest effort to come to terms with post-1980 art in the person of William Kentridge. Krauss would formulate this formalist commitment in strong terms, against attempts to account for powerful artworks in terms of residual ideas about an artist's individual genius, for instance in the essays "The Originality of the Avant-Garde: A Postmodernist Repetition" and "Photography's Discursive Spaces." For Krauss, and for the school of critics who developed under her influence, the Greenbergian legacy offers at its best a way of accounting for works of art using public and hence verifiable criteria.

Translating ephemeralities into prose
Whether about (Cubist collage, Surrealist photography, early Giacometti sculpture, Rodin, Brâncuși, Pollock) or about art contemporaneous to her own writing (Robert Morris, Sol LeWitt, Richard Serra, Cindy Sherman), Krauss translates the ephemeralities of visual and bodily experience into precise, vivid English, which has solidified her prestige as a critic. Her usual practice is to make this experience intelligible by using categories translated from the work of a thinker outside the study of art, such as Maurice Merleau-Ponty, Ferdinand de Saussure, Jacques Lacan, Jean-François Lyotard, Jacques Derrida, Georges Bataille, or Roland Barthes. Indeed, she participated in the translation of Lacan's key text "Television" which was published in October and later reissued in book form by Norton. Her work has helped establish the position of these writers within the study of art, even at the cost of provoking anxiety about threats to the discipline's autonomy. She is currently preparing a second volume of collected essays as a sequel to The Originality of the Avant Garde and Other Modernist Myths (1986).

In many cases, Krauss is credited as a leader in bringing these concepts to bear on the study of modern art. For instance, her Passages in Modern Sculpture (1977) makes important use of Merleau-Ponty's phenomenology (as she had come to understand it in thinking about minimal art) for viewing modern sculpture in general. In her study of Surrealist photography, she rejected William Rubin's efforts at formal categorization as insufficient, instead advocating the psychoanalytic categories of "dream" and "automatism", as well as Jacques Derrida's "grammatological" idea of "spacing." See "The Photographic Conditions of Surrealism" (October, winter 1981).

Picasso's collages
Concerning Cubist art, she took Picasso's collage breakthrough to be explicable in terms of Saussure's ideas about the differential relations and non-referentiality of language, rejecting efforts by other scholars to tie the pasted newspaper clippings to social history. Similarly, she held Picasso's stylistic developments in Cubist portraiture to be products of theoretical problems internal to art, rather than outcomes of the artist's love life. Later, she explained Picasso's participation in the rappel à l'ordre or return to order of the 1920s in similar structuralist terms. See "In the Name of Picasso" (October, spring 1981), "The Motivation of the Sign" (in Lynn Zelevansky, ed., Picasso and Braque: A Symposium, 1992), and The Picasso Papers (Farrar, Straus and Giroux, 1998).

Freudian theory
From the 1980s, she became increasingly concerned with using a psychoanalytic understanding of drives and the unconscious, owing less to the Freudianism of an André Breton or a Salvador Dalí, and much more to the structuralist Lacan and the "dissident surrealist" Bataille. See "No More Play", her 1984 essay on Giacometti, as well as "Corpus Delicti", written for the 1985 exhibition L'Amour Fou: Photography and Surrealism, Cindy Sherman: 1975–1993 and The Optical Unconscious (both 1993) and Formless: A User's Guide with Yve-Alain Bois, catalog to the exhibition L'Informe: Mode d'emploi (Paris: Centre Pompidou, 1996).

Interpreting Pollock
Years after her time at Artforum in the 1960s, Krauss also returned to the drip painting of Jackson Pollock as both a culmination of modernist work within the format of the "easel picture", and a breakthrough that opened the way for several important developments in later art, from Allan Kaprow's happenings to Richard Serra's lead-flinging process art to Andy Warhol's oxidation (i.e. urination) paintings. For reference, see the Pollock chapter in The Optical Unconscious, several entries in the Formless catalog, and "Beyond the Easel Picture", her contribution to the MoMA symposium accompanying the 1998 Pollock retrospective (Jackson Pollock: New Approaches). This direction provided intellectual validation for the explosive Pollock markets; but it exacerbated already tense relations between herself and more radical currents in visual/cultural studies, the latter growing steadily impatient with the traditional western art-historical canon.

In addition to writing focused studies about individual artists, Krauss also produced broader, synthetic studies that helped gather together and define the limits of particular fields of practice. Examples of this include "Sense and Sensibility: Reflections on Post '60s Sculpture" (Artforum, Nov. 1973), "Video: The Aesthetics of Narcissism" (October, spring 1976), "Notes on the Index: Seventies Art in America", in two parts, October spring and fall 1977), "Grids, You Say", In Grids: Format and Image in 20th Century Art (exh. cat.: Pace Gallery, 1978), and "Sculpture in the Expanded Field" (October, spring 1979). Some of these essays are collected in her book The Originality of the Avant-Garde and Other Modernist Myths.

Bibliography

Selected books by Krauss 
Terminal Iron Works: The Sculpture of David Smith. Cambridge, Massachusetts: MIT Press, 1971.
The Sculpture of David Smith: A Catalogue Raisonné. Garland Reference Library of the Humanities, 73. New York: Garland, 1977.
Passages in Modern Sculpture. Cambridge Mass: The MIT Press, 1977.
The Originality of the Avant-Garde and Other Modernist Myths. Cambridge, Massachusetts: MIT Press, 1985.
L'Amour fou: Photography & Surrealism. London: Arts Council, 1986. Exhibition at the Hayward Gallery, London, July to September 1986.
Le Photographique : Pour une théorie des écarts. Translated by Marc Bloch and Jean Kempf. Paris: Macula, 1990.
The Optical Unconscious (1993)
Formless: A User's Guide (with Yve-Alain Bois) (1997)
The Picasso Papers (1999)
A Voyage on the North Sea: Art in the Age of the Post-Medium Condition (1999)
Bachelors (2000)
Perpetual Inventory (2010)
Under Blue Cup. Cambridge, Massachusetts: MIT Press, 2011.

Selected essays and articles by Krauss 
MIT Press: selected articles by Rosalind Krauss
"Contemporary Criticism." Markham, Ont.: Audio Archives of Canada, 1979. 1 sound cassette: 1 7/8 ips.
Critical Perspectives in American Art, pp. 25–27. Introduction by Hugh M. Davies. Amherst: Fine Arts Center Gallery, University of Massachusetts, Amherst, 1976. Rosalind Krauss' text is followed by illustrations of works by Donald Judd, Robert Artschwager and Joel Shapiro. An Exhibition selected by Rosalind Krauss, Sam Hunter and Marcia Tucker. Fine Arts Center Gallery, University of Massachusetts/Amherst, April 10, 1976 – May 9, 1976, American Pavilion, Venice Biennale, summer 1976.
"Death of a Hermeneutic Phantom: Materialization of the Sign in the Work of Peter Eisenman." In Peter Eisenman's Houses of Cards, pp. 166–184. New York: Oxford University Press, 1987.
 "Formless: A User's Guide" [excerpt], October 78, MIT Press, 1996.

Book reviews by Krauss 
 "Man in a Mold." Review of James Lord, Giacometti: A Biography. In The New Republic, Dec. 16, 1985, pp. 24–29.
 "Post-History on Parade." Review of three books by Arthur Danto. In The New Republic, May 25, 1987, pp. 27–30.
 "Only Project." Review of Richard Wollheim, Painting as an Art. In The New Republic, September 12 & 19, 1988, pp. 33–38.

About Krauss 
Yve-Alain Bois. "Rosalind Krauss with Yve-Alain Bois," The Brooklyn Rail, 2012.
Matthew Bowman, "Rosalind Krauss," Fifty Key Writers on Photography edited by Mark Durden, pp. 149–194. New York: Routledge, 2013.
Matthew Bowman, “October’s Postmodernism” in Visual Studies: A Journal of Documentation, vol. 31 nos 1-2, pp. 117–126. 2015
David Carrier. Rosalind Krauss and American philosophical art criticism. Greenwood Publishing Group, 2002. , 
Anna C. Chave, "Minimalism and Biography," Art Bulletin March 2000.
Janet Malcolm, "A Girl of the Zeitgeist", Part II, The New Yorker, October 27, 1986.
Scott Rothkopf, "Krauss and the Art of Cultural Controversy," The Harvard Crimson, May 16, 1997.
David Raskin, "The Shiny Illusionism of Krauss and Judd", Art Journal Spring 2006.
Judy K. Collischan Van Wagner, "Rosalind Krauss," Women Shaping Art: Profiles of Power, pp. 149–164. New York: Praeger, 1984

Reviews of Krauss's work

The Originality of the Avant-Garde and Other Modernist Myths 
Bois, Yve-Alain. Art Journal (Winter 1985), pp. 369ff.
Carrier, David. Burlington Magazine (November 1985), 127(992): 817.
Owens, Craig. "Analysis Logical and Ideological." Art in America (May 1985), pp. 25–31. Reprinted in Beyond Recognition: Representation, Power, and Culture, pp. 268–283. Berkeley: University of California Press, 1992.
List of reviews of The Originality of the Avant-Garde

The Optical Unconscious
Roger Kimball, "Feeling Sorry for Rosalind Krauss," New Criterion 1993
Reviews of The Optical Unconscious

The Picasso Papers 
Marilyn McCully, "The Fallen Angel?" review of The Picasso Papers in New York Review of Books, April 8, 1999.
Harry Cooper and Marilyn McCully, "The Picasso Papers: An Exchange," New York Review of Books, October 7, 1999.

Art Since 1900 
Claire Bishop, Artforum.com, Apr. 9, 2005
Matthew Collings, The Guardian May 14, 2005
Martin Gayford, arts.telegraph Apr. 24, 2005
Eric Gibson, OpinionJournal.com Mar. 11, 2005
Barry Gewen, New York Times Dec. 11, 2005
Dan Hopewell, Iconoduel Apr. 9, 2005
Pepe Karmel, review of Art Since 1900, in Art in America, Nov. 2005, pp. 61–63.
Barry Schwabsky, The Nation Dec. 8, 2005
Frank Whitford, Times Online (UK) Mar. 20, 2005

General material about Krauss
David Cohen, review of Challenging Art in Art Bulletin, Sept. 2002
Columbia University: Rosalind Krauss
MIT Press: Rosalind Krauss
Robert Storr, letter to the editor, Artforum Nov. 2002
Eddie Yeghiayan: Articles About Rosalind Krauss

References

1941 births
Living people
American art critics
Photography critics
Harvard University alumni
Wellesley College alumni
Massachusetts Institute of Technology faculty
Wellesley College faculty
Princeton University faculty
Hunter College faculty
Graduate Center, CUNY faculty
Columbia University faculty
Frank Jewett Mather Award winners
Translators of Jacques Lacan
Jewish American historians
Jewish women writers
Women art historians
American art historians
American women journalists
American women critics
20th-century French women writers
20th-century translators
American women historians